Rhescuporis I may refer to:

 Rhescuporis I (Odrysian), Odrysian King of Thrace, 240–215 BC
 Rhescuporis I (Sapaean), Sapean King of Thrace, 48-41 BC